William Payne House is a historic home located at Greece, Monroe County, New York. It was built in 1905, and is a -story, Queen Anne style frame dwelling with a hipped and cross-gable roof.  It is sheathed in clapboard and features a full-with front porch.  Also on the property is a contributing carriage house.

It was listed on the National Register of Historic Places in 2012.

References

Houses on the National Register of Historic Places in New York (state)
Queen Anne architecture in New York (state)
Houses completed in 1905
Buildings and structures in Monroe County, New York
National Register of Historic Places in Monroe County, New York
1905 establishments in New York (state)